Utanohi (Japanese: うたの日, Songs Day) is an annual music festival held in Okinawa. Headliners include Seijin Noborikawa, Begin, Rimi Natsukawa, Orange Range, HY, Mongol800, Kariyushi58, 2side1brain, Perfume and The Boom, best known for the song "Shima Uta".

See also
 Okinawan music
 Music of Japan

External links
 Songs day Official web site
 
 http://prtimes.jp/main/html/rd/p/000000452.000001355.html

Annual events in Japan
Rock festivals in Japan
Okinawan music
Festivals in Okinawa Prefecture